Disk Drill is a data recovery utility for Windows and macOS developed by Cleverfiles. It was introduced in 2010, and is primarily designed to recover deleted or lost files from hard disk drives, USB flash drives and SSD drives with the help of Recovery Vault technology. While Disk Drill was originally exclusive to the Mac, a Windows version was released in 2015.

Recovery vault
The core of Disk Drill is a Recovery Vault technology which allows to recover data from a medium that was secured by Recovery Vault beforehand. Recovery Vault runs as a background service and remembers all metadata and  properties of the deleted data. Thus making it possible to restore deleted files with their original file names and location.

Supported file systems
The Mac version of Disk Drill provides recovery from HFS/HFS+ and FAT disks/partitions (only the paid Pro version can actually recover files, the Free version will only allow Previewing files).

In August 2016, Disk Drill 3 announces support of macOS Sierra.

Data backup
Disk Drill can be also used as a backup utility for creating copies of the disk or partition in DMG images format.

Version for Windows
In February 2015, CleverFiles launched a Windows version of its data recovery software for macOS. While in beta, Disk Drill for Windows is licensed as a freeware and allows to recover the deleted files from storage devices that can be accessed from Windows PC. Disk Drill for Windows also includes the Recovery Vault technology and works on any Windows XP system or newer (Windows Vista, 7, 8, 10). The software is compatible with FAT and NTFS, as well as HFS+ and EXT2/3/4 file systems.

In September 2016, CleverFiles announced the availability of Disk Drill 2 for Windows, the new version of the expert-level data recovery app.

Release history

See also
 Data recovery
 Data remanence
 File deletion
 List of data recovery software
 Undeletion

References

External links
 

Data recovery software
Utilities for macOS
Freeware